Emil Pažický (14 October 1927 in Považský Chlmec – 21 November 2003 in Bratislava) was a Slovak football player, who played for Czechoslovakia, for whom he obtained 18 caps (seven goals). He was a participant at the 1954 FIFA World Cup, and played mostly for ŠK Žilina and Slovan Bratislava.

In 1955 he became the top goalscorer of the Czechoslovak First League, and he scored a total of 123 goals in the league.

References

External links

 FIFA profile
 Zomrel legendárny strelec Emil Pažický

1927 births
2003 deaths
Slovak footballers
Czechoslovak footballers
1954 FIFA World Cup players
Czechoslovakia international footballers
ŠK Slovan Bratislava players
Dukla Prague footballers
MŠK Žilina players
Sportspeople from Žilina
Association football forwards
AS Trenčín players